Brixx was a Danish pop group which represented Denmark in the Eurovision Song Contest 1982, with the song "Video, Video".

The group members were Jens Brixtofte (brother of the Danish politician Peter Brixtofte), John Hatting, Torben Jacobsen, Steen Ejler Olsen and Bjørn Holmgård Sørensen.

Danish pop music groups
Eurovision Song Contest entrants for Denmark
Eurovision Song Contest entrants of 1982